is a manga by Osamu Tezuka that began serialization in 1951.

Plot
In the year 1876, a young boy named Takonosuke Arashi joins a Japanese envoy on their way to negotiate trades with the USA. However, en route to Washington D.C., the envoy is attacked by pirates in the Caribbean Sea. Takonosuke and the other survivors receive half of a treasure map from the British pastor Picar. Before anyone can reach safety, a massive tornado swallows them up and scatters them across the US, sending Takonosuke to the Nevada desert.

In Nevada, bar owner Ham Egg and outlaw Wild Bill Hecock get wind of the torn treasure map and join the race for the rest of it. Others soon join the quest for the whole map including Count Monte Christo, Arsene Lupin, and more in a mad chase around the world.

Characters
Takonosuke Arashi
Monte Christo
Pochi/Shiro/Pesu/Inu (the dog has four names)
Duke Red as "Wild Bill Hecock"
Ham Egg as himself
Princess Furari
Doctor Yashimu
Aritake Chikara as "Louise Bamba"
Princess Maria
Panther in Morocco
Arsene Lupin

See also
List of Osamu Tezuka manga
Osamu Tezuka
Osamu Tezuka's Star System

References

External links
Age of Adventure at TezukaOsamu.Net

1951 manga
Adventure anime and manga
Kodansha manga
Osamu Tezuka manga
Digital Manga Publishing titles
Shōnen manga